Charles Shead Odell (1830 – 11 October 1875) was a cricketer who played two matches of first-class cricket for Canterbury in 1869 and 1871.

References

External links
 

1830 births
1875 deaths
New Zealand cricketers
Canterbury cricketers
Sportspeople from Cambridge